Flinders Street is a street in Melbourne, Victoria, Australia. Running roughly parallel to the Yarra River, Flinders Street forms the southern edge of the Hoddle Grid. It is exactly 1 mi (1.609 km) in length and one and a half chains (99 ft, 30 m) in width. It is named for the explorer Matthew Flinders, erroneously credited with discovering Port Phillip at the time of its naming. It extends eastwards as far as Spring Street and the Treasury Gardens and westwards past Batman's Hill to the Melbourne Docklands. As the closest street to the river, Flinders Street serviced Melbourne's original river port. Customs House, now the site for Victoria's Immigration Museum, is on Flinders Street.

The street is home to Flinders Street station, the central station in Melbourne's suburban rail network. Tram routes 70 and 75, as well as the City Circle route, run along Flinders Street, and the Flinders Street Viaduct runs parallel to the street, linking the city's two major railway stations.

Other landmarks on Flinders Street include Federation Square, St Paul's Cathedral, Young and Jackson Hotel, the Banana Alley Vaults, the old Herald & Weekly Times building, Melbourne Aquarium and Batman Park, which adjoins the Yarra River. It was once home to the Melbourne Fish Market, an ornate building constructed in 1890, covering 23,000 square metres, and of similar design to Flinders Street station. The market was demolished between 1958 and 1960 after which the site became a public carpark. The site is now home to the three towers of the Northbank Place complex which includes office space, residential apartments, retail outlets and a multi-level carpark.

King Street Overpass
An overpass was built over the intersection with King Street as part of the construction of the King Street Bridge and Kings Way, extending from Downie Street to just east of Custom House Lane. 

Excavation commenced on the foundations of the southern side of the overpass on 6 January 1959, and by 7 September, the first steel girders were erected. Upon completion of this first stage on 21 November 1959, trams were diverted onto temporary tracks laid by the Melbourne & Metropolitan Tramways Board on this part of the structure. On 23 November 1959, construction on the foundations on the northern side of the overpass commenced, and by 20 February 1960, the remainder of the steelwork on this portion was erected. Following the erection of beams and the concreting of decks and permanent tram tracks, trams were diverted from the temporary tracks during the weekend of 11-13 June 1960. The northern traffic lanes heading eastbound were open to traffic on 1 July 1960, with southbound lanes open not long afterwards.

Many businesses and properties were overshadowed by the overpass which resulted in property values dropping and the closure of hotels, shops and showrooms. Plans to revitalise the area in the early 1960s never eventuated. In May 2002, the state government announced it would be demolished, but it would be May 2005 before work commenced, with preparations for Melbourne's 2006 Commonwealth Games acting as a catalyst. The project concluded in August.

2017 car attack

On 21 December 2017, a driver ploughed through a crowd on Flinders Street, injuring 19 pedestrians. The perpetrator, Saeed Noori, appeared in court on 23 December, charged with 18 counts of attempted murder and one count of reckless conduct endangering life. According to the Melbourne Police, Noori, a 32-year-old Australian of Afghan descent, had a history of assault, drug use and mental health issues. He was remanded in custody and ordered to undergo a psychiatric assessment.

See also
 Wailing Wall (Melbourne)

References

Streets in Melbourne City Centre